Doug Bohaboy (born 25 September 1976) is a retired American tennis player.

Bohaboy has a career high ATP singles ranking of 250 achieved on 23 June 2003. He also has a career high doubles ranking of 222 achieved on 23 September 2002.

Bohaboy has won 1 ATP Challenger doubles title at the 2002 Tampere Open.

Tour titles

Doubles

References

External links
 
 

1976 births
Living people
American male tennis players
People from Mountain View, California
Sportspeople from Palo Alto, California
Tennis people from California